Gola Barood is a 1989 Indian Hindi-language action film directed by David Dhawan, produced by Ravindra Dhanoa, starring Shatrughan Sinha and Chunky Pandey. The music was composed by Bappi Lahiri. Following its release in August 1989, it has received mixed reviews.

Plot
Vijay is the son of a police officer, who detests the way his father treats hardcore criminals. One day he is attacked by criminals but is saved by Shambhu, an honest truck driver from nowhere. As time passes Shambhu becomes a dreaded criminal with a history of escaping prisons. Vijay takes interest in reforming criminals, and eventually becomes a Deputy Jailor and takes charge of Shambhu. Conflicts and emotions take place until one day Dabur, another villain, kidnaps Vijay's mother. Shambhu saves her and they become friends. But now Dabur kidnaps Shambhu's sister and asks Shambhu to rob the treasury. Shambhu has to rob the treasury to save his sister, and Vijay wants to stop him. Will Shambhu save his sister? Will Vijay stop the robbery? Or will Dabur succeed in his mission of evil?

Cast
Shatrughan Sinha as Shambhu
Chunky Pandey as Vijay
Kimi Katkar as Reena
Sonam as Pickpocket
Gulshan Grover as Vishraj
Sadashiv Amrapurkar as Dabar
Dalip Tahil as Tony
Dan Dhanoa as Jack
Jagdeep as Bus Conductor
Pankaj Udhas as himself
Om Shivpuri as Police Commissioner
Anil Dhawan as Police Inspector
Shafi Inamdar as Jailor Sharma
Sudhir Pandey as Inspector Mahendranath
Anjana Mumtaz as Mrs. Mahendranath
Asha Sharma as Shambhu's Mother
Kavita Thakur as Guddi
Sunil Dhawan as Shambhu's Maternal Uncle

Songs

References

External links

1989 films
1980s Hindi-language films
Films directed by David Dhawan
Films scored by Bappi Lahiri
Indian action films
1989 action films